Will Wagner is an American football coach and former player.  He served as the head football coach at the Angelo State University from 2011 until he was fired during the 2018 season.  Wagner was hired as the seventh head football coach at Angelo State University on December 23, 2010. Prior to coming to Angelo State, he served as the defensive backs coach and assistant head coach at Northwest Missouri State University.

High school and college
Will Wagner grew up in Odessa, Texas. He attended Permian High School where as a defensive back and wide receiver he helped lead his team to win the State Championship in 1991, his senior year. He went on to attend Hardin–Simmons University in Abilene, Texas where he was a four year starter, set the school record for interceptions in a season, set an American Southwest Conference record for career picks and earned All-American honors.

Coaching career
After graduating with a degree in Exercise Science in 1996, Will stayed at Hardin–Simmons University and served as a graduate assistant for the 1997 season. Will then transferred to Northwest Missouri State to serve as a graduate assistant for Mel Tjeerdsma. He served as a graduate assistant for two years before being hired on as a defensive back coach in 2000. He was promoted to assistant head coach in 2006. While at Northwest Missouri coach Wagner helped oversee an incredibly successful team that had 15 consecutive winning seasons, 11 NCAA DII playoff appearances, 7 NCAA Division II National Championship Game appearances and 3 NCAA Division II National Championships during his tenure.

After the Fall 2010 football season Angelo State University fired previous head coach Dale Carr. After a national search Will Wagner was named one of four finalists for the head coach position. On December 23, 2010 ASU athletic director Kathleen Brasfield announced the hiring of Will Wagner as the 6th head coach of the ASU Rams.

Family
Wagner is married to Andrea Wagner. They have two sons and a daughter, Brooks, Brayden, and Blair.

Head coaching record

References

External links
 Abilene Christian profile
 Angelo State profile

Year of birth missing (living people)
Living people
American football defensive backs
Abilene Christian Wildcats football coaches
Angelo State Rams football coaches
Hardin–Simmons Cowboys football coaches
Hardin–Simmons Cowboys football players
Northwest Missouri State Bearcats football coaches
People from Odessa, Texas
Players of American football from Texas